Samuel John Ross Jr. (born July 15, 1971), known as S. John Ross, is a game designer and owner of Cumberland Games & Diversions.   He wrote the early Indie role-playing game Risus.

Career
Ross began writing professionally in 1990 writing role-playing material for Avalon Hill, Flying Buffalo, Guardians of Order, Last Unicorn Games, Steve Jackson Games, TSR, West End Games, White Wolf, and Wizards of the Coast in addition to his own company, Cumberland Games & Diversions.

Ross' Uresia: Grave of Heaven (2003) was an original setting published for the Big Eyes, Small Mouth role-playing game; it was reminiscent of Swords & Sorcery anime. Ross created Risus: The Anything RPG and Sparks paper miniatures.  He also created the retro-science fiction-fantasy role-playing game Encounter Critical, and maintains the All-Systems Library.

His fonts have appeared on television, books and billboards. They have been used by Anheuser-Busch, Atheist Bus Campaign, Comedy Central, Disney Italy, Office Depot, Penguin Books and Ariane Sherine.

In Discordianism, he wrote Novus Ordo Discordia, the Gospel of St. Pesher the Gardener, which was included in Apocrypha Discordia, and the "foreplay" or foreword for Ek-sen-trik-kuh Discordia: The Tales of Shamlicht., both under the name Patriarch
Wilhelm Leonardo Pesher-Principle.

He was nominated for an Origins Award for a short stint as editor of Pyramid magazine, and was named to the Order of the Pineapple along with author Adam Gorightly in 2013. Risus 1.5 was named Best Free RPG at RPGnet in 2001 and he contributed to Pulp Hero which received a Silver ENnie for Best Writing in 2006.

Ross has been a named guest at several conventions including Technicon in 1995, 1997, and 1998; A-Kon in 2004 and 2009; and Starland Gamefest in 2013.  Ross was a special guest at GameFest held in May 2014.

Personal life
S. John Ross was born as Samuel John Ross Jr., in Cumberland, Maryland on July 15, 1971.  He is the son of Sam and Donna Ross.  While he lived in various parts of the United States and in Japan, as of early 2014 he lived in Denver, Colorado, with his wife Sandra Ross.

Works
S. John Ross wrote these works:

GURPS Russia and GURPS Warehouse 23 for Steve Jackson Games (also, co-authored GURPS Grimoire and GURPS Black Ops)
Among the Clans: The Andorians and the Star Trek Narrator's Toolkit for Last Unicorn Games
Uresia: Grave of Heaven for Guardians of Order
Encounter Critical, originally published as hoax purportedly designed in the 70s.
Risus: The Anything RPG and Points in Space for Cumberland Games & Diversions
The Pokethulhu Adventure Game for Squishy Brain Games
Treasures of a Slaver's Kingdom which won the XYZZY Award 2007 for the best NPC
“The Big List of RPG Plots”

He was editor and developer of The Silicon Valley Tarot, and the 2nd Edition of Murphy's Rules.

Ross is the owner and creator of Cumberland Games and Diversions, a web-based electronic publishing company specializing in game-related documents and TrueType fonts.

References

External links
  S. John Ross: personal blog
  Cumberland Games & Diversions
 
 

1971 births
Living people
American gamebook writers
Discordians
GURPS writers
People from Cumberland, Maryland
Role-playing game designers
Writers from Maryland